The communauté de communes des Rives du Cher was located in the Cher  département  of the Centre  region of France. It was created in January 1994. It was merged into the new Communauté de communes Arnon Boischaut Cher in 2011.

The Communauté de communes comprised the following communes:

La Celle-Condé
Châteauneuf-sur-Cher
Corquoy
Lapan
Lignières
Montlouis
Saint-Symphorien
Venesmes
Villecelin

References 

Rives du Cher